Alycia Chrystiaens (born 12 January 2001) is a French rugby sevens player. She plays for Lille Métropole RC Villeneuvois. She won a bronze medal at the 2022 Rugby World Cup Sevens.

References 

2001 births

Living people
French rugby sevens players
France international women's rugby sevens players